is a member of the Japanese imperial family. She is the only child of Emperor Naruhito and Empress Masako of Japan.

Following her birth, the ongoing Japanese imperial succession debate had resulted in some politicians holding a favorable view on rescinding agnatic primogeniture imposed by World War II allies on the constitution of Japan. However, once her uncle and the current crown prince Fumihito had his son Hisahito in September 2006 he became next in the line of succession following his father. Aiko remains at present legally ineligible to inherit the throne, while debate about the possibility of having future empresses regnant continues.

Birth

Princess Aiko was born on 1 December 2001 at 2:43 PM in the Imperial Household Agency Hospital in Tokyo Imperial Palace, 
the first and only child of the then-Crown Prince and Crown Princess, Naruhito and Masako.

In a break with tradition, the name of the princess was chosen by her parents, instead of by the Emperor. It was selected from clause 56 of Li Lou II, one of the teachings of the Chinese philosopher Mencius. The princess also has an imperial title, which means "a person who respects others".

Education
Princess Aiko began her education at Gakushūin Kindergarten on 3 April 2006. She left kindergarten on 15 March 2008.

On her eighth birthday, it was revealed her interests included writing kanji characters, calligraphy, jump rope, playing piano and violin, and writing poetry.

In early March 2010, Aiko began to stay home from school due to being bullied by boys in her elementary school. Aiko returned to school on a limited basis on 2 May 2010. After returning to school, a senior palace official said that she would attend a limited number of classes accompanied by her mother, upon advice from a doctor at the Crown Prince's household.

In November 2011, Aiko was hospitalized with pneumonia. In 2014, she enrolled at the Gakushuin Girl's Junior High-school.

In the summer of 2018, she made her first solo trip abroad to attend a summer program at Eton College. Reports from an unnamed palace source close to the family reported that Aiko provides her mother Masako with emotional support in her new role as empress. In February 2020 she was accepted at Gakushuin University where she is to major in Japanese language and literature.

Public life

From the age of 16, Aiko began accompanying her parents at public appearances. She was ineligible to attend any of her father's ascension ceremonies in person as she was still a minor at the time. On 5 December 2021, the Sunday after her 20th birthday, she participated in formal coming of age ceremonies and was awarded the Grand Cordon of the Order of the Precious Crown by the Emperor. She attended the 2022 New Year celebration at the Imperial Palace as her first public event as a working member of the imperial family. Her first press conference took place on 17 March. Her next public outing was on 5 November, when she participated with her cousin Princess Kako of Akishino in a so-called "Gagaku" concert organized by the Imperial Household Agency. On 24 November, Princess Aiko visited an exhibition at the Tokyo National Museum, with her parents.

Succession to the throne
The Imperial Household Law of 1947 abolished the Japanese nobility; under provisions of this law, the imperial family was streamlined to the descendants of Emperor Taishō. The laws of succession in Japan prevent inheritance by or through women.

Debate

The birth of Princess Aiko sparked debate in Japan about whether the Imperial Household Law of 1947 should be changed from the current system of agnatic primogeniture to absolute primogeniture, which would allow a woman, as firstborn, to inherit the Chrysanthemum Throne ahead of a younger brother or male cousin. Although Imperial chronologies include eight empresses regnant in the course of Japanese history, their successors were always selected from amongst the members of the paternal Imperial bloodline, which is why some conservative scholars argue that the women's reigns were temporary and that male-only succession tradition must be maintained in the 21st century. Though Empress Genmei was followed on the throne by her daughter, Empress Genshō, Genshō's father, Prince Kusakabe, was also a member of the imperial dynasty, as the son of Emperor Tenmu, and therefore Genshō was a patrilineal descendant of the imperial bloodline. In addition, Empress Genshō herself was succeeded by her brother's son, thus keeping the throne in the same agnatic line; both Genshō and Genmei, as well as all other empresses regnant and emperors, belonged to the same patriline.

A government-appointed panel of experts submitted a report on 25 October 2005, recommending that the Imperial succession law be amended to permit absolute primogeniture. On 20 January 2006, Prime Minister Junichiro Koizumi used part of his annual keynote speech to address the controversy when he pledged to submit a bill to the Diet letting women ascend to the throne in order that the Imperial throne be continued into the future in a stable manner. Koizumi did not announce a timing for the legislation to be introduced nor did he provide details about the content, but he did note that it would be in line with the conclusions of the 2005 government panel.

Birth of male cousin

Proposals to replace agnatic primogeniture were shelved temporarily after it was announced in February 2006 that the-then Crown Prince's younger brother, Fumihito, Prince Akishino, and his wife, Kiko, Princess Akishino, were expecting their third child. On 6 September 2006, Princess Kiko gave birth to a son, Hisahito, who was third in line to the Chrysanthemum Throne at the time of the birth under the current law, after his uncle, the then-Crown Prince, and his father, Prince Akishino. The prince's birth provided the first male heir to be born in the imperial family in 41 years. On 3 January 2007, Prime Minister Shinzō Abe announced that he would drop the proposal to alter the Imperial Household Law. Therefore, at this time, it seems unlikely that the succession laws will be changed to allow Princess Aiko to ascend the throne.

Titles, styles and honours

Titles and styles 
Princess Aiko is styled as "Her Imperial Highness Princess Aiko". She also has an imperial title, .

Honours

National honours
:  Grand Cordon of the Order of the Precious Crown (5 December 2021)

References

External links
 Their Majesties the Emperor and Empress at the Imperial Household Agency website
 Press Conference by Their Imperial Highness The Crown Prince and Crown Princess After the Birth of Her Imperial Highness Princess Aiko
 Press Conference on the occasion of the First Birthday of Her Imperial Highness Princess Aiko (2002) (Written Answers)
 BBC News | Japan's new princess meets the public

Japanese princesses
2001 births
Living people
People from Tokyo
21st-century Japanese women
Grand Cordons (Imperial Family) of the Order of the Precious Crown
Daughters of emperors